William O. Hansen was a member of the Wisconsin State Assembly.

Biography
Hansen was born on October 7, 1860 in Beloit, Wisconsin. Jobs he held include blacksmith. In 1889, Hansen married Nellie Gravdale and they would have four children. Hansen and his wife were Lutherans. He died on October 22, 1930.

His twin brother, Edward F. Hansen, was also a member of the Assembly.

Political career
Hansen was elected to the Assembly in 1904. Previously, he had been a Beloit alderman from 1890 to 1892. He was a Republican.

References

External links

Politicians from Beloit, Wisconsin
Republican Party members of the Wisconsin State Assembly
Wisconsin city council members
American Lutherans
20th-century Lutherans
American blacksmiths
1860 births
1930 deaths
Burials in Wisconsin